This is a list of adult nonfiction books that topped The New York Times Nonfiction Best Seller list in 1991.

See also

 New York Times Fiction Best Sellers of 1991
 1991 in literature
 Lists of The New York Times Nonfiction Best Sellers
 Publishers Weekly list of bestselling novels in the United States in the 1990s

References

1991
.
1991 in the United States